Patù is a town and comune in the province of Lecce in the Apulia region of south-east Italy.

Main  sights
Mother Church of St. Michael Archangel (1564), with a late Renaissance façade and a single nave. The entrance portal has the inscription Terribilis est locus iste ("Terrible Is This Place").
Church of San Giovanni Battista, in Byzantine-Romanesque style (10th-11th centuries)
Church of the Madonna di Vereto.
Crypt of Sant'Elia, built by Basilian monks in the 8th-9th centuries.
Torre del Fortino, the last surviving of the four towers of the destroyed castle.
Archaeological site of Vereto, a Messapic ancient town
Centopietre ("Hundred Stones"), a tomb-mausoleum of a knight who was killed by the Saracens before a battle fought nearby in 877.

References

Cities and towns in Apulia
Localities of Salento